Comillas is an administrative neighborhood of Madrid belonging to the district of Carabanchel. It is 0.665999 km² in size. With a perimeter of 4,257 m, it is limited by the A-42/paseo de Santa María de la Cabeza, the Antonio de Leyva Street and the Manzanares.

References 

Wards of Madrid
Carabanchel